Ali Jannati (born 1949) is an Iranian politician and former diplomat who served as counselor to the head of Iranian presidential administration, in the second cabinet of Hassan Rouhani. He was minister of culture from 15 August 2013 until his resignation on 19 October 2016.

Early life and education
Jannati was born in 1949. He is the son of Ayatollah Ahmad Jannati, head of Iranian Guardian Council and Tehran's interim prayer leader. He is a graduate of the Haqqani school in Qom.

Career
Jannati has had various positions in different public institutions of Iran. He began his career in the Revolutionary Guards as being commander-in-chief of Armed Forces in Khorasan Province. Then he was appointed governor general of Khuzestan Province. Then he joined the Islamic Republic of Iran Broadcasting (IRIB), and served as its manager in the Ahvaz branch and as judiciary envoy to IRIB.

He served as deputy minister of culture for international affairs. He was Iran's ambassador to Kuwait from 1998 to 2005 and deputy interior minister for political affairs from 2005 to 2006.

Culture Ministry 
He was nominated as culture and Islamic guidance minister by President Hassan Rouhani on 4 August 2013 and was confirmed by the Majlis on 15 August, receiving  234 votes for and 36 votes against. 12 Majlis members were absent in the voting session.

In February 2015, he was harshly criticized by conservatives after the music album To Ra Ey Kohan Boomo Bar Doost Daram was published. He was also criticized by reformists after his functions in cancellation of concerts in some cities. He resigned on 19 October 2016 as part of a cabinet reshuffle, after days of speculations about his dismissal by President Hassan Rouhani.

References 

1949 births
Living people
People from Qom
Islamic Revolutionary Guard Corps officers
Governors of Razavi Khorasan Province
Iranian diplomats
Ambassadors of Iran to Kuwait
Iranian Vice Ministers
Government ministers of Iran
Moderation and Development Party politicians
Islamic Republican Party politicians